Cora pseudobovei is a species of basidiolichen in the family Hygrophoraceae. Found in Bolivia, it was formally described as a new species in 2016 by Karina Wilk, Manuela Dal Forno, and Robert Lücking  The specific epithet pseudobovei refers to its resemblance to Cora bovei. Here, in this puna grassland ecoregion, it grows on the ground amongst mosses.

References

pseudobovei
Lichen species
Lichens described in 2016
Lichens of Bolivia
Taxa named by Robert Lücking
Basidiolichens